Phulgama is a ward of Nagarain Municipality in Dhanusa District in the Janakpur Zone of south-eastern Nepal. At the time of the 1991 Nepal census it had a population of 8,564 persons living in 1539 individual households.

History 
Phulgama is situated 9 km south of the contemporary king Rajarshi Janak's capital Janakpur. It is believed that the princess Sita used to collect flowers to worship in Girija Sthaan, which is why it was given the name Phulgama.

References

External links
 UN map of the municipalities of Dhanusa District

Populated places in Dhanusha District